David Quinlan is an English film critic, journalist, film historian and author.

Quinlan was the film critic for TV Times from 1972 to 2006. Other contributions to film periodicals include Films Illustrated, Photoplay, Films and Filming and Film Review.

He co-edits the film review website PicturesThatTalk.com with Alan Frank.

Books 
Publications include:
 Quinlan's Illustrated Directory of Film Stars (five editions from 1981)
 Quinlan's Illustrated Directory of Film Directors (two editions from 1983)
 British Sound Films: The Studio Years 1928-1959 (1984)
 Quinlan's Illustrated Directory of Film Character Actors (three editions from 1985)
 Wicked Women of the Screen (1987)
 Quinlan's Illustrated Directory of Film Comedy Stars (1992)
 TV Times Film Guide (six annual editions from 1994)
 Tom Hanks: a Career in Orbit (1997)

References

External links
 Official site

English film critics
British film historians
Living people
Writers from London
Year of birth missing (living people)